Prophecy is reggae, dancehall artist Capleton's fifth studio album. It was released on November 7, 1995. The album features a guest appearance from a member of the Hip Hop supergroup Wu-tang clan, Method Man.

The album was listed in the 1999 book The Rough Guide: Reggae: 100 Essential CDs.

Track listing

References

1995 albums
Capleton albums